Caffromorda platycephala is a species of beetle in the family Mordellidae, the only species in the genus Caffromorda.

References

Mordellinae
Mordellidae genera
Monotypic Cucujiformia genera